John Warhurst is a British sound editor. He won the Academy Award for Best Sound Editing for the film Bohemian Rhapsody (2018).

Biography 
He was born in Brighouse, West Yorkshire. Warhurst graduated from the University of Huddersfield with a BMus (Hons) degree in Orchestral Composition and Arrangement and a Master’s degree in Electro-Acoustic Composition. Warhurst's professional career started in 1998 when he became a music editing assistant in London. Warhurst has worked on numerous films inclusing The Woman in Black, 127 Hours, Hannibal Rising, Lord of the Rings: The Return of the King and Harry Potter and the Chamber of Secrets.

In 2012 he was part of the sound team who won the BAFTA Award for Best Sound at the 66th British Academy Film Awards for Les Misérables. He won the BAFTA Award for Best Sound at the 72nd British Academy Film Awards and the Academy Award for Best Sound Editing for the film Bohemian Rhapsody at the 91st Academy Awards.

Selected filmography
 Les Misérables (2012)
 One Direction: This Is Us (2013)
 Bohemian Rhapsody'' (2018; co-won the Academy Award for Best Sound Editing with Nina Hartstone)

References

External links
 

Living people
Place of birth missing (living people)
Year of birth missing (living people)
American sound editors
Best Sound Editing Academy Award winners
Alumni of the University of Huddersfield